Solor is a volcanic island located off the eastern tip of Flores island in the Lesser Sunda Islands of Indonesia, in the Solor Archipelago. The island supports a small population that has been whaling for hundreds of years. They speak the languages of Adonara and Lamaholot. The official estimate as at mid 2021 was 35,045.

Administrative Districts 
The island is divided into three districts (kecamatan), tabulated below with their areas (in km2) and their populations at the 2010 Census and 2020 Census, together with the official estimates as at mid 2021. The entire island is administered by the East Flores Regency.

History of European contact

In 1520, the Portuguese established a trading post in the village of Lamakera on the eastern side of the island as a transit harbor between Maluku and Portuguese Malacca. In 1562, Dominican priests built a palm-trunk fortress which Javanese Muslims burned down the following year. The fort was rebuilt from more durable materials and the Dominicans commenced the Christianisation of the local population. By 1590 the Portuguese and Christian population numbered about 25,000. There were, however, repeated displays of resistance against both the Portuguese and their religion; in 1598–1599, for example, the Portuguese required an armada of 90 ships to put down a Solorese uprising.

At this time, there was a conflict between the traders and the priests, so the traders left Solor and settled in Larantuka at Flores island. When the Dutch came in 1613, the priests surrendered at the first attack and were brought to Larantuka, too.

The Dutch kept the fort, but did not make a profit close to the Portuguese port. After two commanders defected to the Portuguese, they gave up Solor. In 1636 the Portuguese were attacked by the Dutch and had to abandon the fort. In 1646 the Dutch occupied the fort again. The first of the new commanders was suspended, because he married an indigenous woman. The second commander challenged the Portuguese commander to a duel and was slain. In 1648 the Dutch left and the Dominican priests returned.

In 1851 the Portuguese governor José Joaquim Lopes de Lima sold Solor and other areas of the Lesser Sunda Islands, which had been under Portuguese sovereignty, to the Netherlands for 200,000 florins without authorization from Lisbon. Lisbon did not recognise the sale and had Lopes arrested. He died on the way back to Europe. From 1854 the agreements were renegotiated. The sale was finally confirmed in the Lisbon Treaty and was ratified in 1859. Although the Dutch occupied the fort with a small force, the occupation was withdrawn again in 1869 for economic reasons but the official affiliation to the Netherlands remained. It was under Japanese occupation between 1942 and 1945, but along with the state of East Indonesia was later annexed into the United States of Indonesia with independence in 1949.

Towns and villages
Aplame
Balawelin
Kelike
Kukuwerang
Lamakera, Indonesia
Lamawolo
Lewograran
Liko
Pamakayo 
Balawelin I - Riangtaliha and Lamalewo
Balawelin II - Riangmuda and Rianglaka
Daniwato
Enatukan
Sulengwaseng 
Kenere
Lemanu
Kelike - Lewolo and lamagohan
Karawatung
Ongalereng
Menanga
Liwo
Lebao
Lamboleng
Apelame
Buwu-Atagamu
Lewograran
Lewohedo
Amakebo
Wulublolong
Lohayong

References

External links
 Portuguese and Dutch in Timor and Solor
 The Remains of the Portuguese Fort of Solor

Solor Archipelago
Portuguese colonialism in Indonesia
1613 establishments in the Dutch Empire
Populated places in Indonesia
Islands of Indonesia